Soapberry is a common name for several plants and may refer to:

 Plants in the genus Sapindus, native to warm temperate to tropical regions in both the Old World and the New World.  The berries of these plants contain a natural, low-sudsing detergent called saponin.
 Canada buffaloberry (Shepherdia canadensis) is also known as "soapberry" and is native to North America.  This shrub bears bitter yet edible red berries.

See also
 Soapbush
 Soapweed (disambiguation)